Juan Pablo Rodríguez  (born June 21, 1967) is a Canadian politician who has served as the minister of Canadian heritage since 2021. A member of the Liberal Party, he represents Honoré-Mercier in the House of Commons. Rodriguez previously served as the Government Chief Whip, Minister of Canadian Heritage and Multiculturalism and Leader of the Government in the House of Commons.

Early life and career
Rodriguez was born on June 21, 1967, in San Miguel de Tucumán, Argentina. When he was eight, Rodriguez's family fled to Canada after their home was bombed during the Dirty War as his father was repeatedly jailed and tortured for his activism.

Prior to entering politics, Rodriguez, who has a degree in business administration from the University of Sherbrooke, had worked for over twelve years in the fields of public affairs and management of international projects.

Throughout his career, Rodriguez has dedicated much of his time to humanitarian causes. His work particularly focused on helping developing countries and the eradication of poverty. He was the Vice President of Oxfam Québec from 2000 to 2004.

Federal politics

Opposition MP
Rodriguez was elected as a Liberal to the House of Commons of Canada for the Quebec riding of Honoré-Mercier in 2004, 2006 and 2008. For most of his first stint in Parliament, he was the only Liberal representing a riding in eastern Montreal, a longstanding stronghold for the Bloc Québecois.

Rodriguez was chair of the Standing Committee on Official Languages, the Official Opposition’s Critic for of the Francophonie and Official Languages, and Critic for Public Works and Government Services Canada. He has served on many committees of the House of Commons, including the Committee of Canadian Heritage, Official Languages and the Public Accounts Committee.

On February 14, 2007, a bill Rodriguez put forward was passed by the Commons that would give the Conservative government 60 days to come up with a plan to respect Canada's engagements under the Kyoto Protocol.

He is the Past President of the Quebec wing of the Liberal Party of Canada.

He was the Quebec Chair of Michael Ignatieff's candidacy in the 2006 Liberal Party of Canada leadership election.

In the 2011 election he was defeated by the New Democratic Party's Paulina Ayala amid the NDP's surge in Quebec.

In government
Rodriguez sought a rematch with Ayala in the 2015 election. Amid a Liberal surge almost as large as the NDP's surge four years earlier, he defeated Ayala to return to Parliament as one of Prime Minister Justin Trudeau's MPs.

42nd Canadian Parliament
Rodriguez served as Chief Government Whip for a year and a half from 30 January 2017.

Rodriguez served in the 42nd Canadian Parliament as the Minister of Canadian Heritage from July 18, 2018 until dissolution of that government on November 20, 2019. One of his signature initiatives at Heritage was the expansion of the Canada Periodical Fund from magazine-format monthlies to daily broadsheets. This was announced in Bill Morneau's 21 November 2018 "fiscal update" as a $600-million slush fund over five years. The measure was widely applauded in the press "by an eclectic group of media outlets, including Postmedia, which owns the National Post, Torstar, which publishes the Toronto Star, SaltWire Network, and the CBC among others."

43rd Canadian Parliament
Rodriguez was re-elected in the 2019 federal election.

From formation on 20 November 2019 until dissolution, Rodriguez served as Leader of the Government in the House of Commons.

44th Canadian Parliament
After the 2021 election, Rodriguez was re-appointed as Minister of Canadian Heritage on 26 October 2021.

Electoral record

Criminal charge
On April 16, 2010, Rodriguez was charged under the Criminal Code of Canada, after he collided his BMW with a parked car in Montreal.  Police attending the crash reported Rodriguez had bloodshot eyes and alcohol on his breath, and during attempts to administer a breathalyzer test, Rodriguez "breathed very weakly and cut his breath repeatedly, all the while holding the plastic tip at the edge of his lips".

According to Rodriguez himself, "Because I'd consumed a moderate amount of wine during the previous supper, the police officer asked me to proceed with a breathalyzer test, using a hand-held machine, which I did without hesitation".

Despite the criminal charge, Rodriguez remained in the Liberal caucus.

References

External links
 
  Official website of Pablo Rodriguez
 Bio & mandate from the Prime Minister

1967 births
Canadian people of Argentine descent
Argentine emigrants to Canada
Francophone Quebec people
Liberal Party of Canada MPs
Living people
Members of the House of Commons of Canada from Quebec
Naturalized citizens of Canada
People from San Miguel de Tucumán
Politicians from Montreal
Université de Sherbrooke alumni
21st-century Canadian politicians
Members of the King's Privy Council for Canada
Members of the 29th Canadian Ministry